Akhilesh K. Gaharwar (born January 3, 1982, Nagpur, India) is an Indian academic and an associate professor in the Department of Biomedical Engineering at Texas A&M University. The goal of his lab is to understand the cell-nanomaterials interactions and to develop nanoengineered strategies for modulating stem cell behavior for repair and regeneration of damaged tissue.

Education and work
Gaharwar completed his postdoctoral training with Robert Langer at Massachusetts Institute of Technology and Ali Khademhosseini at Harvard University. He received his PhD in Biomedical Engineering from Purdue University, Master in Technology (M.Tech.) from Indian Institute of Technology, Bombay and Bachelor of Engineering (B.E) from Visvesvaraya National Institute of Technology.

Gaharwar's research experience spans diverse fields, including materials science, chemistry, biology, and engineering of polymeric biomaterials and nanocomposites. He is developing advanced biomimetic nanostructure for functional tissue engineering. His research program integrates nanomaterials and stem cells for the development of functional tissue engineering. He is leveraging principles from biomedical engineering, materials science, bioprinting, microfabrication, chemistry, and stem cell biology in a unique way to address some of the daunting challenges in regenerative medicine.

Gaharwar has published more than 130 journal articles, two-issued/pending patents, and more than 100 conference presentations and have H-index of 57. In addition, he also edited biomedical textbook entitled "Nanomaterials in Tissue Engineering: Fabrication and Applications". Gaharwar has published extensively in the area of nanomaterials, biomaterials, bioprinting, tissue engineering, and stem cell bioengineering. His work has been published in leading journals and routinely highlighted in international media including New York Times.

Gaharwar's research accomplishments are recognized by numerous national and international awards, including the NIH New Innovator Award (DP2), Texas A&M University President Impact Fellow, Cellular and Molecular Bioengineering (CMBE) Rising Star Award, Chemical communications Emerging Investigator, CMBE Young Innovator Award, and Dimitris Chorafas Foundation Award. Before the age of 40, Dr. Gaharwar was recognized as a Fellow of the American Institute for Medical and Biological Engineering (AIMBE), an honor reserved for the top 2% biomedical engineers in the world. He is an Associate Editor of a reputed bioengineering journal - ACS Applied Materials and Interfaces, as well as on the editorial board member of the top bioengineering journals including Regenerative Biomaterials, Bioprinting, Advanced NanoBiomed Research, and Bio-Design and Manufacturing.

Awards
	2022 Fellow of American Institute for Medical and Biological Engineering (AIMBE)(March 2022)
	2021 Texas A&M University Presidential Impact Fellow (Nov 2021)
	2018 Rising Star Award by Cellular & Molecular Bioengineering Special Interest Group of Biomedical Engineering Society (Jan 2018) 
	2018 Langmuir Early Career Authors in Fundamental Colloid and Interface Science (Jan 2018) 
	2017 National Institutes of Health (NIH) Director's New Innovator Award (DP2) by National Institute of Health (Oct 2017) 
	2011 Biomedical Engineering Society Graduate Award
	2011 Materials Research Society Graduate Student Award - Silver

References

1982 births
Living people
Texas A&M University faculty
Fellows of the American Institute for Medical and Biological Engineering
Purdue University College of Engineering alumni
IIT Bombay alumni
Indian bioengineers
Scientists from Nagpur
Indian emigrants to the United States
Bioengineers
Bioengineers
Scientists from Texas
American people of Indian descent
Indian scholars